ELEAGUE Season 2 was the second season of the ELEAGUE Counter-Strike: Global Offensive league that ran from October 21, 2016, to December 3, 2016, and was broadcast on cable television on TBS. The season featured 120 teams overall and 16 teams in the main tournament from across the world competing in a seven-week season, which included a regular season and a playoffs. The broadcast was simultaneously available on the online streaming service Twitch.

The season began with Season 1 semifinalist mousesports defeating Brazil's second best team Immortals and ended in the grand finals with OpTic Gaming pulling off an upset against Astralis to take home Season 2's ELEAGUE title.

Format
Season 2 will reflect a format much like a CS:GO major, such at the recent ESL One Cologne 2016.

The top eight finishers from last season's ELEAGUE will automatically be invited to compete in the second season. The other sixteen teams are invited to play in the Closed Qualifiers in their respective continents. Each continent will feature three open qualifiers that have sixteen teams each.

Each continent will have three open qualifiers, and each open qualifier will have sixteen teams playing in a single elimination, best of one bracket. Four teams from the first and second European open qualifiers, three from the third European qualifier, two from the first and second North American qualifiers, and one from the third North American qualifier will move on to play in their respective closed qualifiers.

Eleven teams from the European open qualifiers and five teams from the North American open qualifiers will compete in their respective closed qualifiers. Four teams from each closed qualifier will progress to ELEAGUE Season 2, making a total of sixteen teams. In both closed qualifiers, teams will play in a single elimination, best of three bracket until a four teams remain.

The group stage will feature four groups, making four teams per group. Teams will play in a double elimination group stage. The highest seed in the group will play against the lowest seed and the other two teams will play against each other. The two winners and two losers will then play against each other. The winner of the winners match will move on to the Playoffs and the loser of the winners match will play a third match against the winner of the losers match. The loser of the losers match is eliminated from the tournament. The last two teams in the group will play; the winner of the match will get a spot in the Playoffs and the loser will head home. The top two teams in each group will advance to the Playoffs.

The Playoffs will consist of the eight teams. Teams will play in a single elimination, best of three bracket and will keep playing until a winner is decided.

Qualifiers

European Closed Qualifier

North American Closed Qualifier

1 SK Gaming released its Danish roster and picked up the roster of Luminosity Gaming. Luminosity then picked up the roster of Winout.net, another Brazilian team, after its former roster leaves for SK. The former Danish squad, now under the organization Heroic, was not invited to any qualifier.

Teams Competing
The top eight teams from ELEAGUE Season 1 will be joined by eight other teams, four from each closed qualifier.

Broadcast Talent
Analysts
 Richard Lewis
 Duncan "Thorin" Shields
 Jason "moses" O'Toole
 Scott "SirScoots" Smith

Commentators
 Anders Blume
 Auguste "Semmler" Massonnat
 Daniel "ddk" Kapadia
 James Bardolph

Interviewers
 Kate Yeager
 Rachel "Seltzer" Quirico

Observers
 Heather "sapphiRe" Garozzo
 DJ "Prius" Kuntz
 Kevin "kVIN_S" Swift
 Benjamin "CoffeeMcSwagger" Budka

Group stage

Group A

Group B

Group C

Group D

† Game was broadcast on TBS.

Playoffs

Final standings

References

Counter-Strike competitions
2016 in esports
ELeague competitions